The Weld-Blundell Prism ("WB", dated 1800 BCE) is a clay, cuneiform inscribed vertical prism housed in the Ashmolean Museum in Oxford. The prism was found in a 1922 expedition in Larsa in modern-day Iraq by British archaeologist Herbert Weld Blundell. The four sides, about 20 cm high and 9 cm wide, are inscribed in the Sumerian language with lists of Sumerian kings; each side contains the text in two columns: this is the famous Sumerian King List. It is considered as the most complete of the Sumerian King Lists which have been found, of which there are approximately 25 more or less complete fragments as of 2016.

The list begins with the antediluvian rulers and ends with Sin-magir of the Isin dynasty (r. 1827–1817). The list was most likely written in Sin-magir's final year, or soon after.
Many, especially antediluvian, kings are credited with incredibly long reigns (counted in sars and nerah), as a result of which many scholars consider this work to be more artistic than historical.

Various theories are being constructed in an attempt to explain such large numbers. They are supposed to express the great importance of rulers who were considered demigods. According to another version, sar (3600 years) and ner (600 years), the units of time measurement in the Sumerian number system, should be taken as years and months, respectively.

This text of the Old Babylonian period (Isin dynasty, c.1827–1817 BCE) is inscribed in traditional Sumerian cuneiform.

See also
Sumerian King List

References

External links
Information on the Ashmolean Museum's website

Ancient Near and Middle East clay objects
19th-century BC inscriptions
1922 archaeological discoveries
Isin-Larsa period
Cuneiform